

 
Daly is a locality in the Northern Territory of Australia located about  south-east of the territory capital of Darwin.

Daly is located on land on the north side of the Adelaide River. Its boundaries and name were gazetted on 29 October 1997.

The 2016 Australian census which was conducted in August 2016 reports that Daly had no people living within its boundaries.

Daly is located within the federal division of Lingiari, the territory electoral division of Nelson and within the local government area of the Litchfield Municipality.

References

Suburbs of Darwin, Northern Territory